Briancoppinsia is a fungal genus in the family Arthoniaceae. It is monotypic, containing the single species Briancoppinsia cytospora, a lichenicolous fungus that parasitises  lichens, as well as Cladonia, Lepra, and Lecanora conizaeoides, among others. The species was first described scientifically by Léon Vouaux in 1914 as Phyllosticta cytospora. The genus was circumscribed in 2012 by Paul Diederich, Damien Ertz, James Lawrey, and Pieter van den Boom. The genus was named for Brian John Coppins, who is, according to the authors, an "eminent British lichenologist and expert of lichenicolous fungi".

Its morphology is reminiscent of Phoma cytospora, a lichenicolous coelomycete found on several genera of lichens. However, B. cytospora has several distinct characters, both anatomical, chemical and within DNA sequence that characterised it as a different species.

References

Arthoniaceae
Arthoniomycetes genera
Lichenicolous fungi
Taxa described in 2012